Mukgye Seowon is a seowon located at Mukgye-ri, Giran-myeon of the Andong City, North Gyeongsang Province, South Korea. Seowon is a type of local academy during the Joseon Dynasty (1392–1897). It was established by the local Confucian scholars in 1706, the 32nd year of King Sukjong's reign to commemorate the scholarly achievement and good dead of Kim Gye-haeng (金係行 1431–1517) and Ok Go (玉沽 1382–1436) both of which were civil ministers.

Gallery

See also
Dosan Seowon
Korean Confucianism

References

External links

 묵계서원 at Korea Tourism Organization

Seowon
Andong
1702 establishments in Asia
Buildings and structures in North Gyeongsang Province